The 1972 Nice International Championships, was a men's tennis tournament played on outdoor clay courts at the Nice Lawn Tennis Club in Nice, France that was part of Group D of the 1972 Grand Prix circuit. It was the second edition of the tournament and was held from 17 April until 23 April 1972. Ilie Năstase won the title.

Finals

Singles
 Ilie Năstase defeated  Jan Kodeš 6–0, 6–4, 6–3
 It was Năstase's 5th singles title of the year and the 14th of his career.

Doubles
 Jan Kodeš /  Stan Smith defeated  Frew McMillan /  Ilie Năstase 6–3, 6–3, 7–5

References

External links
 ITF tournament edition details

Nice International Open
1972
Nice International Open
Nice International Open
20th century in Nice